SPANX family member N5 is a protein that in humans is encoded by the SPANXN5 gene.

References

Further reading